The Passionate Pursuits of Angela Bowen is a 2016 biographical documentary film by Jennifer Abod and Mary Duprey, depicting the life of Angela Bowen. Bowen grew up in Boston during the Jim Crow era, and grew up to become a classical ballerina, a noted dance teacher, a black lesbian feminist activist, a writer and a professor at Cal State Long Beach.

Synopsis 
The film looks into the life of Angela Bowen (1936–2018), who was a black lesbian feminist activist, a classical ballerina and renowned dance teacher, and ultimately a professor in the California State University system. Her activism was equally strong in all aspects of her life – she was as impassioned in her advocacy for the arts as she was for LGBTQI rights, which she championed as strongly as she did black women's rights.

The Passionate Pursuits follows Bowen's life from her childhood as a black girl in inner-city Boston during the Jim Crow era across the decades, until she became a legendary figure in her pursuits as a teacher, writer, feminist and activist. The film includes historic footage, photographs and interviews with key people from her past, such as her dance mentor, her dance partner, her former husband, her children, activists, and scholars. Interwoven throughout the film's narrative is the recognition of how race, class, gender and sexuality influenced her, and played into her choices and her survival strategies.

Production 
Director Jennifer Abod, who is a radio personality, musician, feminist activist and journalist, first met Angela Bowen in 1979. The two became life partners, eventually marrying in 2013, after more than 30 years together. Abod began making The Passionate Pursuits in 2000, at the onset of Bowen's Alzheimer's disease, in an effort to capture and share the extraordinary life of a woman whose passion and brilliance had pushed beyond the oppressive barriers of sexism and racism.

In 2014, Abod launched a crowdfunding project on Indiegogo, donations drive project to fund the film, fueled by orders of her film and book, The Old Women’s Project.

Reception  
The Passionate Pursuits of Angela Bowen met with positive reviews, and garnered several awards.

Beverly Guy-Sheftall, Professor of Women's Studies at Spelman College, wrote in a review of the film: "'Passionate Pursuits' is a compelling portrait of an important figure in the evolution of contemporary Black feminist history in the United States. The extraordinary life of Angela Bowen—dancer, writer, scholar, activist, professor—provides a window on important aspects of 20th century African American history, women's history and LGBTQ history." Dee Jay Cox, in a review for CV Weekly, opined that "The Passionate Pursuits of Angela Bowen will inspire audiences to pursue their dreams with tenacity and courage."

Awards

Festival screenings 

 London Feminist Film Festival
 Arts & Ideas Festival
 New Haven International Film Festival
 The Roxbury International Film Festival
 Outside the Frame: Radical Queer Film Festival
 Mix Film Festival, Milan
 North Carolina Gay/Lesbian Film Festival
 GayLesbioco E Queer Culture
 Green Salon Short Film Festival

See also 

 List of LGBT-related films directed by women

References

External links  
 
 

2016 films
American LGBT-related films
American documentary films
American biographical films
Lesbian-related films
American independent films
2016 LGBT-related films
History of women in California
2010s English-language films
2010s American films